The Thick of It is a British television comedy programme that premiered in 2005 on BBC Four. The series satirises the inner workings of modern British government. It follows the running of a fictional Department of Social Affairs and Citizenship, and most episodes focus on that department's incumbent minister and a core cast of advisors and civil servants, under the watchful eye of Number 10's enforcer, Malcolm Tucker (Peter Capaldi). The supporting characters include people in government, in the opposition, and in the media.

Cast

The Government (Series 1-3) The Opposition (Series 4)

Civil Service

The Opposition (Specials-Series 3), the Coalition Government (Series 4)

Media

Goolding Inquiry

Unseen characters

References

Thick of It, The
Characters